Balboa is a town and municipality in the Department of Risaralda, Colombia, situated 1560 metres above sea level.

References

Municipalities of Risaralda Department